is a Japanese former welterweight kickboxer fighting out of Yamaki Gym in Setagaya, Tokyo. He is the owner of kickboxing gym "TARGET", and the manager of the kickboxing promotion company "R.I.S.E.". He won the world title of WMAF at Junior middleweight. He is Christian.

Biography

Early life
He was born in Saitama, Japan, September 22, 1970. He became a model, but he was halfhearted as he said in interview. For instance, although he had got drunk and had a hangover, he went to the audition.

When he was 20, he decided to attend a fitness club, but he thought it wasn't enough and then he started going to kickboxing gym which was near to his home. That was Yamaki Gym.

He debuted in Spring 1994 as "Ryuji Ibuki".

Winning Japanese Title
In December 1996,　Ito challenged Hammer Matsui's Japanese welterweight title. He won by knockout at 4R, and won the title.

In July 1997, he fought against Koki Date to defend his title, but he lost by unanimous decision and lost his title. Date won the title but he had to return his title as he couldn't defend his title because his skull was caved when he fought against Ito and the doctor ordered not to fight for a year. For this reason, Ito could challenge the title in 2 months later　after his loss.

In September, Ito had a championship for the vacant title of MAJKF Welterweight, and fought against Takashi Idemoto. Idemoto cut Ito's middle of forehead with elbow, but he couldn't open his wound because his stamina ran out. On the other hand, Ito continued to attack with knee and kicks. At the end of 5R, Ito won by unanimous decision, and won the same title again.

Winning World Title
In April 1998, he went to France to attend the world tournament of 67 kg class, fought against Jomhod Kiatadisak. He couldn't take a measure against Jomhod's neck wrestling, and he was knocked out by body shots with knee at 2R. When he was depressed just after the bout, Jomhod' second said him that "Jomhod said I was damaged as much as you were because I'm a human". When Ito heard this, he had confidence and stopped flinching from opponent's title and achievements.

In May, he fought against Luke Kenton (/WMAF#2) for the vacant world title of WMAF at Junior middleweight. He won by majority decision at 5R.

In September, he fought against John Wayne Parr. He cut Parr's middle of the forehead by left elbow at 2R, and the doctor stopped the bout.

In March 2000, he fought against Sangtiennoi Sor.Rungroj (/WMAF#1)to defend his title. At 5R, Saengtiennoi's right shoulder was dislocated because of neck wrestling. He gave up to continue to fight, and Ito retained his title.

Retirement
In November, he got on the ring of K-1 and fought against Takashi Ohno. He overwhelmed ohno with punching and middle kicks, and Ohno managed to continue clinching. This was regarded as passive attitude by referee and he was taken off his points twice, so Ito won by unanimous decision at 5R. Ito received the accident to his brain at the end of the year, the doctor stopped him to continue fighting kickboxing, so that he did a regrettable retirement this time. For this reason, he had a retirement bout(Exhibition) with Masato on March 30, 2001. At interview after the bout, he answered that he would continue to get involved in kickboxing. According to his interview, his best bout was vs. Saengtiennoi.

On February 23, 2003, he established a new kickboxing promotion company "KRS", and he started a continuous kickboxing series event "R.I.S.E." which means Real Impact Sports Entertainment.

Kickboxing record

|-  bgcolor="#c5d2ea"
| 2001-03-30 || Ex ||align=left| Masato || MAJKF "ODYSSEY-1 Ito Takashi Retirement Memorial Match" || Bunkyo, Tokyo, Japan || No Decision || 1 || 2:00
|-
! style=background:white colspan=9 |
|-
|-  bgcolor="#CCFFCC"
| 2000-11-01 || Win ||align=left| Takashi Ohno || K-1 J-MAX 2000 || Bunkyo, Tokyo, Japan || Decision(unanimous) || 5 || 3:00
|-  bgcolor="#CCFFCC"
| 2000-09-03 || Win ||align=left| Ilin Vitali || MAJKF "COMBAT - 2000　King Road II" || Bunkyo, Tokyo, Japan || TKO || 4 || 2:19
|-  bgcolor="#CCFFCC"
| 2000-07-20 || Win ||align=left| Jo-En Hor || MAJKF "COMBAT - 2000 King Road" || Bunkyo, Tokyo, Japan || KO (Left high kick) || 3 || 2:08
|-  bgcolor="#CCFFCC"
| 2000-05-26 || Win ||align=left| Panomtuanlek Chorchanmuang || MAJKF "COMBAT-2000" || Bunkyo, Tokyo, Japan || TKO || 1 || 0:28
|-  bgcolor="#CCFFCC"
| 2000-03-22 || Win ||align=left| Sangtiennoi Sor.Rungroj || MAJKF "COMBAT-2000" || Bunkyo, Tokyo, Japan || TKO (shoulder dislocation) || 5 || 2:28
|-
! style=background:white colspan=9 |
|-
|-  bgcolor="#FFBBBB"
| 1999-09-25 || Loss ||align=left| Reece ToganeGym || MAJKF "Set Fire II - Set fire to kickboxing! -" || Bunkyo, Tokyo, Japan || Decision (Majority) || 5 || 3:00
|-  bgcolor="#CCFFCC"
| 1998-09-19 || Win ||align=left| John Wayne Parr || AJKF & MAJKF Joint Event || Bunkyo, Tokyo, Japan || TKO (Doctor stoppage) || 2 || 2:47
|-  bgcolor="#CCFFCC"
| 1998-07-17 || Win ||align=left| Soldier Ogata || MAJKF "Kick Guts" Kajiwara Ikki Cup|| Bunkyo, Tokyo, Japan || Decision (Unanimous) || 5 || 3:00
|-  bgcolor="#CCFFCC"
| 1998-06-26 || Win ||align=left| Kenichi Nagata || MAJKF "Mach Shidokan Dream Match" || Bunkyo, Tokyo, Japan || KO (Knee) || 3 || 3:08
|-  bgcolor="#CCFFCC"
| 1998-05-22 || Win ||align=left| Luke Kenton || MAJKF "Champion Carnival" || Bunkyo, Tokyo, Japan || Decisoon (Majority) || 5 || 3:00
|-
! style=background:white colspan=9 |
|-
|-  bgcolor="#FFBBBB"
| 1998-04 || Lose ||align=left| Jomhod Kiatadisak ||  || France || KO (Knee to the body) || 2 ||
|-  bgcolor="#CCFFCC"
| 1997-10-25 || Win ||align=left| Morad Sari || MAJKF || Bunkyo, Tokyo, Japan || Decision (Split) || 5 || 3:00
|-  bgcolor="#CCFFCC"
| 1997-09-23 || Win ||align=left| Takashi Idemoto || MAJKF "World Championship" || Bunkyo, Tokyo, Japan || Decisoon (Unanimous) || 5 || 3:00
|-
! style=background:white colspan=9 |
|-
|-  bgcolor="#FFBBBB"
| 1997-07-26 || Loss ||align=left| Koki Date || MAJKF || Bunkyo, Tokyo, Japan || Decision (Majority) || 5 || 3:00
|-
! style=background:white colspan=9 |
|-
|-  bgcolor="#CCFFCC"
| 1997-05-23 || Win ||align=left| Shinji Matsuura || MAJKF || Bunkyo, Tokyo, Japan || TKO ||  || 
|-  bgcolor="#CCFFCC"
| 1997-03-29 || Win ||align=left| Ryuji Goto || MAJKF || Bunkyo, Tokyo, Japan || TKO ||  || 
|-  bgcolor="#CCFFCC"
| 1997-01-26 || Win ||align=left| K Takahashi || MAJKF || Bunkyo, Tokyo, Japan || KO ||  || 
|-
|-  bgcolor="#CCFFCC"
| 1996-12-01 || Win ||align=left| Hannmer Matsui || MAJKF || Bunkyo, Tokyo, Japan || KO || 4 || 2:20
|-
! style=background:white colspan=9 |
|-
|-  bgcolor="#fbb"
| 1996-05- || Loss||align=left| Kenichi Ogata || MAJKF || Bunkyo, Tokyo, Japan || Decision || 5 || 3:00
|-  bgcolor="#CCFFCC"
| 1995-03-23 || Win ||align=left| Sumitomo || K-LEAGUE KENZAN  || Tokyo, Japan || Decision (Unanimous)|| 3 ||3:00
|-
| colspan=9 | Legend:

Titles
The 1st WMAF Super welterweight Champion (Defence: 1)

Awards
1998 MVP (MAJKF, December 26, 1998)
2000 MVP (MAJKF, January 27, 2001)

Trivia
His entrance music is Livin' La Vida Loca by Ricky Martin.
His elder brother Tsutomu "David" Ito is an actor and a businessman.

See also
List of male kickboxers

References

External links
TARGET 
R.I.S.E. 

1970 births
Living people
Japanese male kickboxers
Welterweight kickboxers
People from Iruma, Saitama
Sportspeople from Saitama Prefecture